Niels Petersen Vogt (15 April 1817–8 November 1894) was a Norwegian civil servant and politician. He served as the Norwegian Minister of the Interior five times between 1871 and 1884, and member of the Council of State Division in Stockholm four times 1872–1883. He also served as County Governor in three different counties.

Career
He graduated with a Cand.jur. degree in 1839 and was immediately employed by the Ministry of Justice. He became bureau chief in 1843 and was promoted in 1847. From 1841 to 1842 he was also the acting mayor in Stavanger.

Vogt was appointed as the County Governor of Søndre Bergenhus amt from 1850 until 1860. During that time, he was elected to the Storting from Bergen in 1857. In 1860, he was appointed to be the County Governor of Christianssand stiftamt and the County Governor of Lister og Mandals amt. He was then elected from Kristiansand in 1862 and re-elected in 1865, 1868 and 1871. From 1865 to 1866 he was also the President of the Storting. He resigned as County Governor in 1871.

On 13 May 1871, he was appointed head of the Ministry of the Interior in Frederik Stang's Ministerium. Later, he was alternately a member of the Prime Minister's Department in Stockholm and Minister of the Interior until 1884. In the autumn of 1879, he also headed the Ministry of Justice and Police for six weeks. Like most of the members of Christian August Selmer's ministry (1880–1884), he was deposed by the Prime Minister in March 1884.

After his resignation as minister in 1884, he was appointed County Governor of Buskerud county, a position he held until his resignation in 1890.

Personal life
He was the son of Peter Monrad Vogt, who was the head of the Church Ministry, and his wife Charlotte Juhl, and in 1843 he married Karen Magdalena Arntzen (1819–1870).

In 1860 Vogt was appointed a knight of the Order of St. Olav, and in 1866 promoted to commander. He was the holder of the Grand Cross of the Swedish Order of the North Star and was a knight of the first class of the Austrian Order of the Iron Crown.

References 

1817 births
1894 deaths
Government ministers of Norway
Presidents of the Storting
County governors of Norway